Tiempos Mejores is a 45" LP (single) by Mexican pop singer Yuri. This song was not included in any studio album.

Track listing

References

1984 EPs
Yuri (Mexican singer) albums